Umar Bin Hassan (born 1948) is an American poet and recording artist, associated with The Last Poets. He sold his younger sister's record player to purchase a bus ticket to New York City, where he joined the Last Poets. In the mid-1990s, he recorded a solo album titled Be Bop or Be Dead on Bill Laswell's Axiom Records through Island/PolyGram.

In 1994, Bin Hassan appeared on the Red Hot Organization's compilation CD, Stolen Moments: Red Hot + Cool, appearing on a track titled "This is Madness" alongside Abiodun Oyewole and Pharoah Sanders. The album was named "Album of the Year" by Time magazine.

Bin Hassan appeared on the 2013 Dead Prez album, Information Age (Deluxe Edition).

Solo discography
 Be Bop or Be Dead (Axiom Records, 1993)
 To the Last (Baraka Foundation, 2001)
 Life Is Good (Stay Focused Records, 2002)

References

External links
 Biography of Umar Bin Hassan, from Poetry International Web
Umar Bin Hassan's Web Site

1948 births
Living people
African-American poets
Writers from Akron, Ohio
American spoken word poets
20th-century American poets
20th-century African-American writers
21st-century African-American people